The National Conference of State Legislatures (NCSL), established in 1975, is a "nonpartisan public officials' association composed of sitting state legislators" from the states, territories and commonwealths of the United States.

Background 

According to their website, the mission of the Conference is: to advance the effectiveness, independence and integrity of legislatures and to foster interstate cooperation . . . especially in support of state sovereignty and state flexibility and protection from unfunded federal mandates and unwarranted federal preemption. The conference promotes cooperation between state legislatures in the U.S. and those in other countries. . . . [and] is committed to improving the operations and management of state legislatures, and the effectiveness of legislators and legislative staff. NCSL also encourages the practice of high standards of conduct by legislators and legislative staff.

NCSL maintains an office in Denver, Colorado and Washington, D.C.

Eight Standing Committees, composed of legislators and legislative staff appointed by the leadership of the legislatures, serve as the central organizing mechanism for NCSL members. Each Committee provides a means by which state legislators can share experience, information, and advice on a variety of state issues ranging from policy to management. 

Committees meet together twice each year at the NCSL Capitol Forum and NCSL's Legislative Summit to adopt state-federal legislative policies that will ultimately guide NCSL's lobbying efforts in Washington, D.C. These committee meetings also serve as an opportunity for states to network and establish flows of information as well as experience-based suggestions from other states. In addition to the NCSL Capitol Forum and the Legislative Summit, NCSL builds the state legislative community by hosting various web seminars, leadership meetings, and access to relevant websites and online documents throughout the year. 

Issues spanning multiple committee jurisdictions are managed by NCSL's Task Forces. Unlike the permanent Standing Committees, Task Forces are created for a specific period time and aim to develop positions on highly complex and controversial issues such as immigration reform and welfare. Task Forces are composed of 20 to 30 legislators and legislative staff who are appointed by the NCSL president or staff chair. 

Day-to-day operations of the organization managed by its Chief Executive Officer, Tim Storey. The organization is led by a legislator who serves as its president and by a legislative staffer who serves as staff chair. Twenty years after its founding, NCSL was led in 1994 by its first female president, former Congresswoman Karen McCarthy. Its first African-American president, Rep. Dan Blue, served in 1998–99. The 2021–22 president of NCSL is Representative Scott Saiki of Hawaii, and the staff chair is J.J. Gentry of South Carolina. Each year, NCSL's presidency alternates between legislators of the Republican and Democratic parties.

The NCSL is considered part of the 'Big Seven', a group of organizations that represent local and state government in the United States.

Past NCSL presidents and staff chairs 
 2020–21 – Speaker Scott Saiki and J.J. Gentry 
 2019–20 – Speaker Robin Vos and Martha Wigton
 2018–19 – Senator Toi Hutchinson and Jon Heining
 2017–18 – Senator Deb Peters and Chuck Truesdell
 2016–17 – Senator Michael Gronstal, Senator Dan Blue and Raul Burciaga
 2015–16 – Senator Curtis Bramble and Karl Aro
 2014–15 – Senator Debbie Smith and Peggy Piety
 2013–14 – Senator Bruce Starr and Tom Wright
 2012–13 – Speaker Terie Norelli and Patsy Spaw
 2011–12 – Senator Stephen Morris and Michael Adams
 2010–11 – Senator Richard T. Moore and Tim Rice
 2009–10 – Senator Don Balfour and Nancy Cyr
 2008–09 – Speaker Joe Hackney and Gary VanLandingham
 2007–08 – Representative Donna Stone and Sharon Crouch Steidel
 2006–07 – Senator Leticia Van de Putte and Steve Miller
 2005–06 – Senator Steve Rauschenberger and Susan Clark Schaar
 2004–05 – Delegate John Hurson and Jim Greenwalt
 2003–04 – Speaker Martin Stephens and Max Arinder
 2002–03 – Senator Angela Monson and Gary Olson
 2001–02 – Senator Steve Saland and Ramona Kenady
 2000–01 – Senator Jim Costa and Diane Bolender
 1999–00 – Representative Paul Mannweiler and John B. Phelps
 1998–99 – Representative Dan Blue and Tom Tedcastle
 1997–98 – Senator Richard Finan and Anne Walker
 1996–97 – Representative Michael Box and Russell T. Larson
 1995–96 – Senator James Lack and Alfred "Butch" Speer
 1994–95 – Representative Karen McCarthy, Representative Jane L. Campbell and Ted Terris 
 1993–94 – Senator Robert Connor and John Turcotte 
 1992–93 – Representative Arthur Hamilton and Donald Schneider
 1991–92 – Senator Paul Bud Burke and Terry Anderson
 1990–91 – Speaker John Martin and William Russell
 1989–90 – Representative Lee Daniels and Patrick O'Donnell
 1988–89 – Senator Samuel B. Nunez Jr. and Betty King
 1987–88 – Senator Ted L. Strickland and John Andreason
 1986–87 – Representative Irving J. Stolberg and Sue Bauman
 1985–86 – Senator David Nething and Dale Cattanach
 1984–85 – Representative John Bragg and Leo Memmott
 1983–84 – Senator Miles Ferry and John Lattimer
 1982–83 – Assemblyman William F. Passannante and Joe Brown
 1981–82 – Senator Ross Doyen and Robert Smartt
 1980–81 – Representative Richard Hodes and Patrick Flahaven
 1979–80 – Speaker George Roberts and David Johnston
 1978–79 – Senator Jason Boe and Arthur Palmer
 1977–78 – Senator Fred Anderson and Robert Herman
 1976–77 – Speaker Martin Olav Sabo and McDowell Lee
 1975–76 – Representative Tom Jensen and Bonnie Reese
 1975 – Senator Kevin B. Harrington and Eugene Farnum

Committees
NCSL has 8 standing committees whose membership consists of state legislators and staff:

Budgets and Revenue
Communications, Financial Services, and Interstate Commerce
Education
Health and Human Services 
Labor and Economic Development
Law, Criminal Justice and Public Safety
Natural Resources and Infrastructure
Redistricting and Elections

These committees establish policy positions and coordinate lobbying efforts in Washington DC.

Task forces
NCSL uses task forces to complement the work of the 8 standing committees. Composed of legislators and legislative staff, task forces are temporary and deal with issues that cut across the jurisdictions of multiple standing committees. Currently, there are 8 task forces:

Agriculture
Cybersecurity
Energy Supply
Immigration and the States
Innovations in State Health Systems
Insurance 
International Relations
Military and Veterans Affairs
State and Local Taxation

Policy positions
In the most general terms, NCSL works to enhance the role of states in the federal system. NCSL opposes unfunded federal mandates and federal preemption of state authority, providing state legislatures with the flexibility to implement policy solutions. 
NCSL supports enactment of the Main Street Fairness Act, which would simplify existing sales tax collection laws. The Act would grant states the authority to require all sellers, including online merchants, to collect sales and use taxes, generating billions of dollars of tax revenue for state governments.

Professional staff associations
The organization runs nine professional staff associations.

American Society of Legislative Clerks and Secretaries
The American Society of Legislative Clerks and Secretaries (ASLCS) was founded in 1943 to improve legislative administration, and to establish better communication between clerk and secretaries throughout the United States and its territories. In 1974, ASLCS joined with several state legislative groups to form the National Conference of State Legislatures (NCSL). The society includes an active membership of more than four hundred principal clerks, secretaries, and legislative support staff.

Publications and standards
ASLCS publishes several reference and resource books, including the Legislative Administrator, the Professional Journal, the Roster and Reference Guide, the International Directory, Mason's Manual

The Legislative Administrator is the official newsletter of the American Society of Legislative Clerks and Secretaries.

Professional Journal

"The Journal" provides a forum to share experiences, expertise and opinions on a variety of subjects influencing our daily working environment.

International Directory

The International Directory is a booklet that provides a resource in English, Spanish and French of the objectives and goals of the American Society of Legislative Clerks and Secretaries (ASLCS), Association of Chief Clerks of Mexico's State Legislatures and the Federal Dict of Mexico (ANOMAC), Association of Central American Legislative Clerks (ATELCA), the Canadian Clerks-at-the Table, South African Legislative Secretaries Association (SALSA), and the Australian Clerks. The booklet also contains the names, phone numbers, fax numbers and e-mail addresses of the Executive Committee members of the respective organizations.

Inside the Legislative Process

Inside the Legislative Process is a research tool, providing information on state legislative processes and procedures. The ASLCS committee on Inside the Legislative Process is responsible for reviewing and producing this publication. The committee works closely with NCSL staff to develop survey questions and record the responses in a format that is easily usable by all legislative units and reflects current legislative processes.

International relations
Additionally, the Joint Canadian-American Clerks' Conference is held biennially in odd-numbered years. It is hosted alternately between Canada and the United States. Unlike other Society meetings, participation in this conference is limited to principal clerks and secretaries or to the principal assistant if the clerk or secretary is unable to attend. The meeting typically occurs in August or September. The location is determined by joint recommendation of the ASLCS Canadian/American Relations Committee and the Canadian Association of Clerks-at-the-Table.

Events
NCSL organizes two annual events for the general membership:

NCSL Capitol Forum
Legislative Summit (Annual Meeting)

The Legislative Summit is the largest of these events, partly because it occurs in the summer when state legislatures are in recess. Its location varies year to year. The NCSL Capitol Forum alternates between Washington D.C. and a location that varies year to year.

See also
 American Legislative Exchange Council, a similar organization of conservative legislators and private sector representatives
 Council of State Governments
 State Government Affairs Council
 State Innovation Exchange, an organization that produces model legislation from a progressive standpoint
 State Policy Network, a consortium of conservative and libertarian state think tanks
Uniform Law Commission

References

External links
 www.ncsl.org

 Nonpartisan organizations in the United States
 Government-related professional associations in the United States
1975 establishments in the United States
 Organizations established in 1975